Gunvald Ludvigsen (born 15 February 1949 in Leirfjord) is a Norwegian politician for the Liberal Party.

He was elected to the Norwegian Parliament from Sogn og Fjordane in 2005.

Ludvigsen held various positions in Eid municipality council from 1991 to 1995 and 1999 to 2005, serving the last two years as mayor.

References

1949 births
Living people
Liberal Party (Norway) politicians
Members of the Storting
21st-century Norwegian politicians